The following highways are numbered 590:

Canada
 Alberta Highway 590
 New Brunswick Route 590
 Ontario Highway 590

Ireland
  R590 regional road

United States